Calyptella is a genus of Cyphelloid fungi in the family Marasmiaceae. The genus has a widespread distribution and contains 20 species.

These fungi grow on bark of trees or on the stems of herbaceous plants (generally when they are already dead).  The fruiting bodies are shaped like bells which hang down from a point of attachment, sometimes with short stems.  The smooth fertile surface is on the interior of the bell shape.

Species

See also
List of Marasmiaceae genera

References

External links

Marasmiaceae
Agaricales genera